The 2015 NASCAR Xfinity Series was the 34th season of the 2nd tier Xfinity Series, a professional stock car racing tour sanctioned by NASCAR in the United States. It began with the Alert Today Florida 300 at Daytona International Speedway on February 21, and ended with the Ford EcoBoost 300 at Homestead-Miami Speedway on November 21. Chase Elliott entered the 2015 season as the defending series champion. Chris Buescher won the championship. 
The 2015 season marked two major changes; Comcast's cable brand Xfinity replaced Nationwide Insurance as title sponsor of the series, while Fox, Fox Sports 1, NBC and NBCSN broadcast the series' races, replacing the ESPN networks and ABC.

Teams and drivers

Complete schedule

Limited schedule

Notes

Driver and team changes

 Kevin Harvick, Kasey Kahne, and 2014 K&N Pro Series East champion Ben Rhodes moved to the No. 88 with Dale Earnhardt Jr. for JR Motorsports. Kahne also drove a single race in the No. 5.
 Austin Dillon ran the majority of the Xfinity races for RCR in the No. 33. Brandon Jones ran part-time.
 With Turner Scott Motorsports disbanding, Kyle Larson and ARCA Racing Series driver Brennan Poole shared the No. 42 Camaro under the Chip Ganassi Racing banner, while Dylan Kwasniewski left the team.
 Daniel Suárez began running a full schedule in 2015 for Joe Gibbs Racing in the No. 18 Toyota Camry.
 Elliott Sadler ran the full 2015 schedule with Roush Fenway Racing in the No. 1 Ford Mustang.
 Bubba Wallace moved up from the Camping World Truck Series to run the full 2015 schedule with Roush Fenway Racing in No. 6 Ford Mustang, replacing Trevor Bayne.
 Athenian Motorsports's Xfinity program switched to Chevrolet and moved up full-time, with John Wes Townley running at least 18 races. Dylan Lupton, runner up in the 2014 NASCAR K&N Pro Series West, drove the No. 25 Chevrolet in 7 races.
 Eric McClure departed TriStar Motorsports for a full-time seat with JGL Racing. McClure used the number 24, which he previously used with Front Row Motorsports and Team Rensi Motorsports, while the team switched to Toyota. McClure would return to TriStar after 9 races with JGL, bringing the No. 24 with him, at which time Mike Bliss departed the team; McClure inherited his owner points (JGL retained the owner points McClure scored in the first nine races and reassigned them to the No. 26) while the No. 19 was reassigned to the start-and-park team and Jeff Green.
 Cale Conley ran the full season for TriStar Motorsports after running part-time with Richard Childress Racing in 2014. Conley replaced McClure in the No. 14 Camry. However, Conley failed to complete the season after sponsorship dried up.
 Blake Koch started running full-time for TriStar in the No. 8 Camry after running the team's 10, 44, and 91 cars in 2014.
 David Starr ran full-time for TriStar Motorsports in the No. 44 Toyota after running 13 races for the team in 2014.
 Ross Chastain started racing full-time JD Motorsports in the No. 4 Chevrolet, replacing Jeffrey Earnhardt. Earnhardt would move to Viva Motorsports, splitting the ride with Jamie Dick.
 Harrison Rhodes competed for Rookie of the Year honors with JD Motorsports, driving the No. 0 Chevrolet.

Schedule

The 2015 schedule was announced on August 26, 2014.

Results and standings

Races

Drivers' championship

(key) Bold - Pole position awarded by time. Italics - Pole position set by final practice results or rainout. * – Most laps led. 1 – Post entry, driver and owner did not score points.

Owners' championship (Top 15)
(key) Bold - Pole position awarded by time. Italics - Pole position set by final practice results or rainout. * – Most laps led.

Manufacturers' championship

See also
 2015 NASCAR Sprint Cup Series
 2015 NASCAR Camping World Truck Series
 2015 ARCA Racing Series
 2015 NASCAR K&N Pro Series East
 2015 NASCAR K&N Pro Series West
 2015 NASCAR Whelen Modified Tour
 2015 NASCAR Whelen Southern Modified Tour
 2015 NASCAR Canadian Tire Series
 2015 NASCAR Mexico Series
 2015 NASCAR Whelen Euro Series

References

NASCAR Xfinity Series seasons